Muiruri is a surname. Notable people with the surname include:

John Muiruri (born 1979), Kenyan footballer
Patrick Kariuki Muiruri (born 1945), Kenyan politician